The Federation of British Artists (FBA) consists of nine art societies, and is based at Mall Galleries in London where the societies' Annual Exhibitions are held. The societies represent living artists working in the United Kingdom who create contemporary figurative art. Mall Galleries aim to 'promote, inspire and educate audiences about the visual arts.'

Description

The FBA has over 500 artist-members, who regularly exhibit their work and also accept open submissions from the public. In addition to the member societies, other societies and individual artists also stage shows at Mall Galleries. Over 100 prizes and awards are administered each year by the societies.

The gallery also has a commissions department and Friends organisation. The galleries' education department runs a Schools Programme, which includes gallery based workshops for Primary and Secondary school students.

Gallery projects include a drawing school and summer courses run by the New English Art Club, as well as The Hesketh Hubbard Art Society, the largest life drawing society in London, who meet to draw from life models.

The FBA is a registered charity, number 200048, and was established in 1961.

In February 2011 the Mall Galleries mounted an exhibition, "Pure Gold: 50 Years of the Federation of British Artists", curated by Anthony J Lester, Hon.RMS, FRBA, FRSA. An illustrated, 100-page catalogue was published to accompany the show.

Societies in the FBA

Royal Institute of Painters in Water Colours
Royal Society of British Artists
Royal Society of Marine Artists
Royal Society of Portrait Painters
Royal Institute of Oil Painters
New English Art Club
The Pastel Society
Society of Wildlife Artists
Hesketh Hubbard Art Society

Other exhibiting societies

Societies that have exhibited at Mall Galleries include:
Armed Forces Art Society
East Anglian Group of Marine Artists
Free Painters and Sculptors
The Guild of Aviation Artists
The Royal Society of Miniature Painters, Sculptors and Gravers
Society of Equestrian Artists
The Society of Women Artists
The Society for Art of Imagination
The Wapping Group of Artists

Prizes
Prizes which are awarded at Mall Galleries include:
The Columbia Threadneedle Prize for painting and sculpture
The Sunday Times Water Colour competition
ING Discerning Eye

See also
Ken Howard
William Bowyer
Charles Williams

References

External links
FBA and Mall Galleries
The Threadneedle Prize for painting and sculpture
ING Discerning Eye Exhibition
The Wapping Group of Artists
The Pastel Society
The Royal Institute of Painters in Water Colours
The Royal Society of Portrait Painters

British contemporary art
British artist groups and collectives
1961 establishments in the United Kingdom
Arts organizations established in 1961